The Hannibal was a slave ship, (or Guineaman) hired by the Royal African Company of London. The ship participated in two slave trading voyages, in the Triangular trade. The wooden sailing ship was 450 tons and mounted with thirty-six guns. The ship is most remembered for her disastrous voyage of 1693–95. Captain Thomas Phillips commanded the Hannibal. He was a Welsh sea captain from Brecon, Wales who was employed by the Sir Jeffrey Jeffreys, and others. who owned the Hannibal and were governors and Assistants in the Royal African Company. 

At the age of 28–29 Phillips had commissioned his first slave-trading command. He was directly responsible for the tragic deaths of 328 (47 percent) of the 700 enslaved African women, men and children on board, along with 36 of his crew of 70. A very large number of people died in the cruellest of ways.

Seven hundred enslaved Africans were forced into her hold to sail to the slave-market in Barbados. Many slavers rigged shelves in the middle called a "slave deck" so that individuals could not even sit upright during the most of the voyage. Letters survive of Phillips writing on 8 September 1693, requesting that ‘the mast-makers of Deptford and Woolwich’ to be ordered to work faster in fitting new platforms and that the blacksmiths to have the same orders for ironwork.  The owners of the ship, of which Phillips has a share) were paid £10.50 for every slave they brought to Barbados alive. As a result, the slaves were fed regularly twice a day consisting mainly of corn, beans and pepper which was believed to prevent the white flux. Phillips wrote that he purchased 1,000s of oranges and other fruits on the island of São Tomé (St Thomas) for the slaves. The captives received a litre of water per day, and were forced to exercise up on deck for an hour every evening to keep them fit. Despite these efforts, 47 percent of the slaves died from dysentery, smallpox, physical injuries, starvation, dehydration and suicide on the Hannibals voyage of 1693–1695.

The voyage of 1693–1695
This voyage began from London on 5 September 1693. The ship arrived in Whydah (Ouidah), an African port located in modern-day Benin. Here 700 enslaved Africans were bartered for with goods carried from England purchased. 

Before boarding the ship the enslaved men were put in irons in pairs by their wrists and legs, and branded with a capital "H" on the breast to claim them for the Hannibal. The captives were rowed out the waiting ship a mile and a half off-shore. Only 5–6 persons could be rowed in the local canoes at one time. This meant that boarding 700 people took over a month.

The ship reached Barbados with only 372 enslaved traumatised Africans remaining, alive. For the enslaved Africans who died they were dumped overboard during the voyage with no funeral rites. The largest killer was an outbreak of dysentery. Others may have jumped overboard out of fear as 12 did onboarding the ship. Phillips writes in his journal that 12 slaves 'willfully drowned themselves' during the voyage, and that several others persistently refused food starving themselves to death, 'for it is their Belief that when they die they return to their own Country and Friends again.'

Phillips was deeply involved in the slave trade, in which he had hoped to make a great deal of personal wealth by selling his human cargo. He only made one voyage as a slave trader and retired back to Brecon due to illness, probably Lassa Fever. There he lived a pleasant life in a comfortable town house known as Harvard House which he had inherited from his father, William Phillips. Phillips died in late 1712 or early 1713 and was buried at St Johns the Evangelist, now Brecon Cathedral.

During 2010 in the town of Brecon, Wales controversial plaque was erected, by the then town council, at the expense of local tax payers without their consent. The plaque is to memorialise the life of Captain Thomas Phillips, slave trader and not to remember the 328 enslaved Africans who perished on his ship. During the Black Lives Matter worldwide riots following the murder of George Floyd, the plaque in memory to Captain Phillips was removed by an unknown person and thrown into the nearby river.

 The voyage of 1696–1697 
The Hannibal's next slave-trading voyage (and her last) was undertaken in 1696 under the command of Captain William Hill. This slaving voyage ended in a crew mutiny off the coast of Africa. Before Captain Hill was able to commence trading upon the coast and purchase 700 enslaved Africans at Cape Coast Castle a crew mutiny occurred onboard the ship, on 1 and 2 January 1697.

External link
 Should society memorialise a Slave Trader?
 A Journal of a Voyage Made in the Hannibal of London, Ann. 1693, 1694, From England, to Cape's Monseradoe, in Africa, And thence along the Coast of Guiney to Whidaw, the Island of St. Thomas, An so forward to Barbadoes

 References 
Brecon plaque commemorates a slave trader: Should Society Memories a Slave Trader? https://www.brh.org.uk/site/articles/update-brecon-plaque-commemorates-slave-trader/

Maritime incidents in 1694
Maritime incidents involving slave ships
Slave ships
Age of Sail merchant ships of England
Beninese-American history
The Trans-Atlantic Slave Data Base.Nautical Women. Women sailors and the women of Sailortowns. A forgotten diaspora c.1693–1902'. By Rosemary L Caldicott. Bristol. Radical Pamphleteer #43. Published by Bristol Radical History Group, 2019.